William Golden may refer to:

 William Golden (graphic designer) (1911–1959), American graphic designer
 William Lee Golden (born 1939), American country music singer
 William B. Golden (born 1948), American attorney and politician in Massachusetts
 William T. Golden (1909–2007), American investment banker, philanthropist and science adviser

See also
William Golding (disambiguation)